River Lyd may refer to:

 River Lyd (Gloucestershire), a tributary that flows into the River Severn at Lydney, England
 River Lyd (Devon), a river in Dartmoor, Devon, England